T. N. Viswanatha Reddy (1919-1989) was Indian politician and Member of parliament, Lok Sabha.

He was born to Shri T. N. Ramachandra Reddy at Madanapalli, Chittoor district on 1 July 1919. He was educated at Loyola College and Madras Christian College, Madras. He has married Shrimati Pushpavenamma on 6 October 1944. They had 1 son and 2 daughters.

He was elected to the 1st Lok Sabha from Chittoor (Lok Sabha constituency) as a member of Indian National Congress in 1952.

He was elected for the second term to 2nd Lok Sabha from Rajampet (Lok Sabha constituency) in 1957.

References

External links
 Biodata of T. N. Viswanatha Reddy at Lok Sabha website.

India MPs 1952–1957
India MPs 1957–1962
Telugu politicians
1919 births
1989 deaths
Lok Sabha members from Andhra Pradesh
People from Chittoor district
Indian National Congress politicians from Andhra Pradesh